= 1998 St. Charles County Executive election =

- November 3, 1998

Nominee	Joe Ortwerth	Robert Moeller
Party	Republican	Democratic
Popular vote	45,703	29,951
Percentage	60.41%	39.59%
County Executive before election
Joe Ortwerth
Republican
Elected County Executive
Joe Ortwerth
Republican

The 1998 St. Charles County Executive election took place on November 3, 1998. Incumbent Republican County Executive Joe Ortwerth ran for re-election to a second term. He was challenged in the Republican primary by former State Representative Ron Stivison, and he won renomination with 78 percent of the vote. In the Democratic primary, St. Charles Mayor Robert Moeller defeated former County Presiding Judge Lee Schwendemann with 60 percent of the vote, and advanced to the general election against Ortwerth. Moeller outspent Ortwerth and attracted local union endorsements, but Ortwerth won re-election in a landslide, receiving 60 percent of the vote to Moeller's 40 percent.

== Democratic primary ==
=== Candidates ===
- Robert Moeller, Mayor of St. Charles
- Charles L. "Lee" Schwendemann, former County Presiding Judge
- Chuck Rabenau, Vietnam War veteran

=== Results ===
Democratic primary results
Party	Candidate	Votes	%
Democratic	Robert Moeller	3,954	59.78%
Democratic	Charles L. "Lee" Schwendemann	2,090	31.60%
Democratic	Chuck Rabenau	570	8.62%
Total votes		6,614	100.00%

== Republican primary ==
=== Candidates ===
- Joe Ortwerth, incumbent County Executive
- Ron Stivison, former State Representative

=== Results ===
Republican primary results
Party	Candidate	Votes	%
Republican	Joe Ortwerth (inc.)	9,999	78.21%
Republican	Ron Stivison	2,786	21.79%
Total votes		12,785	100.00%

== General election ==
=== Results ===
1998 St. Charles County Executive election
Party	Candidate	Votes	%
Republican	Joe Ortwerth (inc.)	45,703	60.41%
Democratic	Robert Moeller	29,951	39.59%
Total votes		75,654	100.00%
Republican hold			
